Konstantinos Konstantinou may refer to:
 Konstantinos Konstantinou (cyclist)
 Konstantinos Konstantinou (footballer)
 Konstantinos Konstantinou (judoka)